The 2020 People's National Party (PNP) leadership election was triggered after Peter Phillips announced his intention to resign as Leader of the People's National Party following the party's defeat at the 2020 general election. It was held on November 7, 2020. If Hanna was elected, she would have served as the second female President of a Jamaican political party and the second female Leader of the Opposition in Jamaican history. The election was won by Former Minister of Justice and Member of Parliament for St Andrew Southern and  Attorney Mark Golding who secured 1,740 or 54.6% of the vote.

Background 
The announcement of the election date was made on September 27, 2020 at a meeting of the PNP's National Executive Council (NEC) at the Jamaica Conference Centre in Kingston, with nomination date for candidates occurring from October 19 to 23 and a list of the final delegates produced by October 30.

Declared candidates 
Roles in bold are currently held.

Results

Endorsements 
Leadership candidates were endorsed by various notable politicians and persons representing sectors of civil society.

Mark Golding 
 Luther Buchanan, Former Deputy General Secretary of the PNP
 Gabriela Morris, Senator
 Joan Gordon Webley, Caretaker MP for East Rural St Andrew and Former Ambassador
 Joseph Matalon, Radio Jamaica Chairman
 Scean Barnswell, Councillor for the Hayes Division in the Clarendon Municipal Corporation
 Noel Arscott, Former Vice President of the PNP and former South West Clarendon MP
 Sheryl Lee Ralph, Jamaican-American Actress
 Garfield Sinclair, Chief Executive Officer of The Bahamas Telecommunications Co. Ltd. and Vice President of Cable & Wireless Communications (Northern Cluster)
 Chris Deering, American Businessman and Marketer
 Patricia Duncan-Sutherland, Caretaker MP for South East Clarendon.
 Angela Brown-Burke, MP for Saint Andrew South Western
 Omar Newell, President of the PNP Patriots
 Lydia Richards, Councillor for the Bensonton Division in South East St Ann
Peter Bunting, Former PNP General Secretary and Caretaker MP for Manchester Central
Lambert Weir, Councillor for the Claremont Division in South East St Ann

Lisa Hanna 

 Phillip Paulwell, PNP Vice President
Wykeham McNeill, PNP Vice President
Mikael Phillips, PNP Vice President and MP for North West Manchester
Andre Haughton, Former Opposition Senator, Caretaker for St. James West Central
Janice Allen, Opposition Senator
Donovan Mitchell, Mayor of Mandeville, Councillor for Royal Flat Division
Neville Wright, Councillor, Trench Town Division, St. Andrew South
Imani Duncan-Price, Caretaker MP for Kingston Central
Audrey Smith-Facey, Councillor for St. Andrew South Western
Dwayne Vaz, Former MP for Westmoreland Central, Chairman PNP Region 6
Dennis Gordron, Councillor for Maxfield Park Division, St Andrew East Central
Oswest Senior-Smith, Caretaker MP for North Eastern St Catherine
Patrick Roberts, Councillor for Molynes Division, Caretaker for St. Andrew West Central
Alrick Campbell, Councillor for Edgewater Division, St. Catherine South Eastern
Michael Troupe, Councillor for Granville Division, St. James West Central
 Donna Scott Mottley, Leader of Opposition business in the Senate
 Natalie Neita, MP for North Central St Catherine
 Morais Guy, MP for Central St Mary
Kenord Grant, Councillor for Bridgeport Division, St. Catherine South East
 Denise Daley, MP for East St Catherine
 Valerie Neita Robertson, Caretaker MP for Portland Western
 Venesha Phillips, Councillor for the Papine Division

Opinion polling

See also 

 People's National Party
2020 Jamaican general election
Mark Golding
Lisa Hanna
Phillip Paulwell
Peter Bunting
Damion Crawford
Peter Phillips (politician)
2022 Jamaican local elections

Notes

References

External links 
 PNP's official website
 Mark Golding's official website
Lisa Hanna's official website

2020 in Jamaica
Jamaica